The 2006 County Championship season, known as the Liverpool Victoria County Championship for sponsorship reasons, was contested through two divisions: Division One and Division Two. Each team plays all the others in their division both home and away. This season saw a change in promotion and relegation, with the top two teams from Division Two being promoted to the first division for 2007, while the bottom two sides from Division 1 are relegated.

Teams in the County Championship 2006:

Points system
Teams receive 12 points for a win, 6 for a tie and 4 for a draw. Bonus points (a maximum of 5 batting points and 3 bowling points) may be scored during the first 130 overs of each team's first innings.

Division One

Standings

Division two

Standings

Records

See also

2006 English cricket season

References

County Championship seasons
County Championship, 2006